Daniel "Dani" Vidal Martínez (born 16 May 2000) is a Spanish footballer who plays as a central midfielder for Polvorín FC.

Club career
Vidal was born in Portomarín, Lugo, Galicia, and finished his formation with CD Lugo. Promoted to the reserves ahead of the 2019–20 campaign, he made his senior debut on 25 August 2019 by starting in a 0–1 Tercera División away loss against Arosa SC.

Vidal made his first team debut on 13 September 2020, coming on as a second-half substitute for Manu Barreiro in a 0–2 away loss against CF Fuenlabrada in the Segunda División championship. On 5 January 2022, he was loaned to Segunda División RFEF side Coruxo FC for the remainder of the season.

References

External links

2000 births
Living people
Spanish footballers
People from Lugo (comarca)
Sportspeople from the Province of Lugo
Footballers from Galicia (Spain)
Association football midfielders
Segunda División players
Segunda Federación players
Tercera División players
Tercera Federación players
Polvorín FC players
CD Lugo players
Coruxo FC players